Back to the Blues is the thirteenth solo studio album by Northern Irish guitarist Gary Moore, released in 2001. As implied by its title, it saw Moore return to the electric blues music with which he had found fame since 1990, after two more experimental albums. It was also Moore's first album to feature Darrin Mooney on drums; Mooney would go on to fill the drumming spot on Moore's next two studio albums, as well as his short-lived Scars project and several live albums.

The cover photograph is of Moore at Therapia Lane Tram Depot, Croydon.

Track listing

Personnel
Gary Moore - guitar, vocals
Vic Martin - keyboards
Pete Rees - bass
Darrin Mooney - drums

Horns on track 2:
Martin Drover - trumpet
Frank Mead - tenor saxophone
Nick Payn - baritone saxophone
Nick Pentelow - tenor saxophone
Brass arrangement by Gary Moore & Nick Payn

References

Gary Moore albums
2001 albums
Albums produced by Chris Tsangarides
CMC International albums